Katunayake, is a suburb of Negombo in Western Province, Sri Lanka. It is the site of Bandaranaike International Airport or Colombo Airport, the primary international air gateway to Sri Lanka. With the change of government in 1977 and the introduction of the open economy policy a large area was allocated to create a free trade zone (currently known as the Export Promotion Zone).

Government and infrastructure
Civil Aviation Authority of Sri Lanka has its head office in Katunayake.

SriLankan Airlines is headquartered on the grounds of the airport in Katunayake.

Economy
In 1977 the country's United National Party government introduced an open-economy policy, which led to the creation in 1978 of the country's first Free-trade zone (FTZ), currently known as an Export Processing Zone, in Katunayake. It is governed by the Sri Lankan Board of Investment. In order to attract foreign investment the government provides a number of incentives, including duty-free import and exports, preferential tax, double taxation relief and up to 100% foreign ownership. The Katunayake FTZ houses over one hundred multinational industries, predominantly in the garment and clothing industry. From its inception the FTZ the workforce was predominantly young female migrants from rural villages, mainly from economically and socially marginalised groups.

On 30 May 2011 the police attacked workers at the Katunayake FTZ, protesting against a proposed new pension plan, resulting in the death of one of the protesters and over 200 injuries. The police actions led to the Inspector General of Police, Mahinda Balasuriya, resigning his position.

Transport

Katunayake is the site of the primary airport in the country, Bandaranaike International Airport.

It is served by Sri Lanka Railways' Puttalam Line, with stations at Katunayake, Katunayake South, and the airport.

Negombo is the northern end of the Colombo-Katunayake Expressway which connects Colombo and A1 highway at Peliyagoda. Katunayake is currently served by the A3 highway from Colombo to Negombo.

References

External links
 Sri Lanka Air Force Base

Populated places in Western Province, Sri Lanka